A38 or A-38 may refer to:

 A38 (dairy product), a fermented dairy product sold in Denmark
 A38 (ship), a party boat on the Danube in Budapest, Hungary
 A38 motorway (Netherlands)
 A38 road (England)
 A38 (Sydney), an arterial route in Sydney, Australia
 Bundesautobahn 38, an autobahn in Germany
 English Opening, Encyclopaedia of Chess Openings code
 Aero A.38, a Czech airliner of the 1930s
 Iceberg A-38
 Valiant tank, a WWII-era prototype British tank
 XA-38 Grizzly, a prototype American attack aircraft of the 1940s